Brian Rajadurai (born 24 August 1965) is a Canadian and Sri Lankan cricket player. He started his career playing first-class cricket in his native Sri Lanka and eventually emigrated to Canada. He has represented Canada in the 1997 ICC Trophy and the 1998 Commonwealth Games.

In February 2020, he was named in Canada's squad for the Over-50s Cricket World Cup in South Africa. However, the tournament was cancelled during the third round of matches due to the coronavirus pandemic.

References

External links
Cricket Archive profile

Canadian cricketers
Sri Lankan cricketers
1965 births
Living people
Cricketers at the 1998 Commonwealth Games
Canadian people of Sri Lankan descent
Sinhalese Sports Club cricketers
Canadian sportspeople of Sri Lankan descent
Commonwealth Games competitors for Canada